The Open'er Festival is a music festival which takes place on the north coast of Poland, in Gdynia. It is one of the biggest annual music festivals in Poland. The first edition of the festival was organized in Warsaw in 2002 as Open Air Festival. Open’er Festival won the Best Major Festival prize at the European Festivals Awards ceremony in 2009, 2010 and 2019.

History 

The first Open Air Festival was held in Tor Stegny in Warsaw in 2002, with The Chemical Brothers playing on the main stage. The festival then took place in Kościuszki Square in Gdynia from 2003 to 2005. The last festival in Kościuszki Square attracted over 50,000 people. Since 2006, the festival has taken place in Kosakowo Airport (Babie Doły Military Airport) in Gdynia.

Timeline

Organization
The main organizer of the festival is the concert agency Alter Art. In 2016, there were 5 stages: Orange Main, Alter, Beat, Firestone and Tent. There are also other smaller stages run by sponsors and vendors. Artists also performed in the Silent Disco Area and at the seaside of Gdynia on Gdynia Open Stage, where events are free to attend.

External links 

Open'er Festival Official Website
Heineken Music Official Website
Kosakowo airport on Google Maps
Photographs
Photos section in the official website (festival editions 2004–2006)
Flickr: Photos tagged with "opener" and "festival"
Alex's photos of Open'er Festival 2007
photos of Open'er Festival 2006 at clubbing.waw.pl
Piotr's photos of Open'er Festival 2006
Golik's photos of Open'er Festival 2006 day 1

References 

Music festivals in Poland
Electronic music festivals in Poland
Summer events in Poland